San Diego Sockers are an American professional indoor soccer franchise playing in the Western Division of the Major Arena Soccer League, representing the San Diego area since 2009. The Sockers first played home games at Chevrolet Del Mar Arena at the Del Mar Fairgrounds adjacent to the Del Mar Racetrack in Del Mar, California. They moved to Pechanga Arena, the original home of the MISL Sockers, for the 2012–2013 season. The Sockers plan on moving into Frontwave Arena, a 7,600 multi-purpose indoor sports arena in Oceanside, CA once it opens. The projected opening date is in the first quarter of 2024. 

The Sockers hold the record for the longest winning streak in United States professional soccer history. The streak, which began on December 29, 2010, was snapped after 48 games by a 6–5 overtime road loss to the Dallas Sidekicks on January 27, 2013.

History

1978–1996 
The team began as the Baltimore Comets in 1974 but moved to San Diego as the San Diego Jaws in 1976. After a one-year stay in Las Vegas as the Las Vegas Quicksilvers, the team returned as the San Diego Sockers in 1978. They were owned by Bob Bell and played their indoor games at the San Diego Sports Arena.

Initially, victories came slowly for the club but mounted quickly and they experienced moderate success over their outdoor history winning several division titles.  However, the San Diego Sockers won the North American Soccer League (NASL) Indoor Championships of 1981–82 and 1983–84.
Success was far from over for the San Diego Sockers.  When the NASL folded, the San Diego Sockers moved to the Major Indoor Soccer League and won eight championships: 1983, 1985, 1986, 1988, 1989, 1990, 1991, and 1992.  The Sockers carried their success from one league to the next.  They switched to the Continental Indoor Soccer League for three more years from 1993 to 1995. However, after several ownership changes, Sockers folded after the 1996 season.

2001–2004 
The second version of the San Diego Sockers were a team in the new Major Indoor Soccer League. The team began play in the World Indoor Soccer League in 2001, and joined the MISL when it merged with the WISL for the 2002–2003 season. Just before the beginning of the 2004–2005 season, the Sockers were sold to Raj Kalra, owner of the Vancouver Ravens of the National Lacrosse League. However, barely two months after the purchase, it was revealed that Kalra had not paid the Sockers' players, staff, or rent since taking over, and the league voted to discontinue the franchise on December 30, 2004.

2009–present 
The Sockers were founded in 2009 by David Pike, Carl Savoia and Phil Salvagio. This was the second attempt to revive the Sockers name.  The first team played in the NASL, original MISL, and CISL.  The first revival attempt to play in the WISL and second MISL. The Sockers have enjoyed a significant amount of success since they began play having won both the PASL-Pro championship and US Open Cup of Arena Soccer in their first four seasons. In January 2019, former USMNT player Landon Donovan joined the Sockers in the Major Arena Soccer League.

Colors and badge
At their inception the Sockers featured a color scheme primarily consisting of the royal blue, white, and yellow colors often used by the previous Sockers teams and utilized a modified version of their immediate predecessor's logo. For the 2011 season the team modified their uniforms dropping the yellow in favor of a smaller amount of gold. Their logo also changed to a new shield logo that corresponded to their new uniforms that utilized the 1978 founding date of the original Sockers franchise which the team claims ties to as well as stars representing the 14 titles won by the combined Sockers franchises.

Arena
 Chevrolet Del Mar Arena (2009–2012)
 Pechanga Arena San Diego (2012–present)
 Frontwave Arena (from 2024)

Personnel
As of January 21, 2022.

Active players

Inactive players

Staff

As of January 21, 2022.

Head coach: Phil Salvagio (2009–present)
Assistant coach: Rene Ortiz
Assistant coach: Chiky Luna
Goalkeeper coach: Victor Melendez
Athletic Trainer: Paul Savage
General Manager: Sean Bowers (2016–present)
Owners: David Pike and Carl Savoia (2009–present)

Honors
2009–10, 2010–11 PASL-PRO Western Division Champions
2011–12 PASL Western Division Champions
2012–13 PASL Pacific Division Champions
2014–15 MASL Pacific Division  Regular Season Champions
2016–17, 2017–18, 2018–19 MASL Pacific Division Champions
2021–22 MASL West Division Champions
2009–10, 2010–11 PASL-PRO Champions
2011–12, 2012–13 PASL Champions
2021, 2022 MASL Ron Newman Cup Champions
2009–10, 2010–11, 2011–12 U.S. Open Cup of Arena Soccer Champions
2012 FIFRA Club Champions

Year-by-year 

* The Sockers had no home games due to the COVID-19 pandemic.

Playoff record

* The Sockers had no home games due to the COVID-19 pandemic.

References

External links
 

 
2009 establishments in California
Association football clubs established in 2009
Indoor soccer clubs in the United States
Major Arena Soccer League teams
Professional Arena Soccer League teams
Soccer clubs in California